Alexander Edgar (Ted) Toogood (August 27, 1924 – July 31, 2011) was a Canadian football player who played for the Toronto Argonauts. He won the Grey Cup with them in 1950 and 1952. He previously played football for and attended the University of Toronto, and served in World War II. He later was a teacher, attended West Virginia University (MSc 1958) and was the first athletic director at Ryerson University (1949–1961). Toogood was inducted into the University of Toronto Sports Hall of Fame in 1999, the Ryerson Athletics and Recreation Hall of Fame in 2005 and the Etobicoke Sports Hall of Fame in 2010. He died on July 31, 2011, aged 86, and donated his brain to the Krembil Neuroscience Centre Sports Concussion Project. At the time of his death, he had Alzheimer's disease, and studies of his brain revealed the presence of chronic traumatic encephalopathy, thought to be linked to previous concussions sustained in his football career.

References

1924 births
2011 deaths
Canadian football people from Toronto
Toronto Varsity Blues football players
Toronto Argonauts players
Players of Canadian football from Ontario
University of Toronto alumni
Canadian military personnel of World War II
Canadian expatriates in the United States